The Maryland Department of the Environment (MDE) is a government agency in the state of Maryland that implements and enforces environmental protection laws and programs. The agency's stated vision is "Healthy, vibrant and sustainable communities and ecosystems in Maryland." Its headquarters are in Baltimore, Maryland.

Department responsibilities
The Department's principal functions are:
 Enforcement of environmental laws and regulations, both state and federal. Its several divisions issue pollution control permits, oversee public water systems, supervise cleanup of waste sites and remediation, and provide financial assistance to communities for environmental infrastructure improvements.
 Long-term planning and research.
 Technical assistance to businesses and communities throughout the state in the areas of pollution control and prevention, urbanization and growth, and environmental emergencies.

Organization
The Maryland Department of the Environment was created in 1987 by the Maryland General Assembly, which consolidated environmental regulatory and planning programs from several predecessor agencies.

Serena McIlwain was appointed Secretary of the Environment by Governor Wes Moore in 2023.

The department includes five principal divisions:
 Air and Radiation Administration
 Land and Materials Administration
 Water and Science Administration
 Office of Budget and Infrastructure Financing
 Operational Services Administration.

See also

 Maryland Department of Natural Resources

References

External links
 Maryland Department of the Environment - Official site

1987 establishments in Maryland
Environmental organizations based in Maryland
Environment
State environmental protection agencies of the United States
Maryland